Aleksander Kowalski or Kowalsky may refer to:

 Aleksander Kowalski (ice hockey) (1902-1940), Polish ice hockey player
 Aleksander Kowalski (skier), Polish Nordic combined skier
 Aleksander Kowalski (politician) (1908–1951), Polish trade union activist
 Aleksander Kowalsky (born 1943), Croatian-Austrian classical music conductor
 Alexander Kowalski (musician) (born 1978), German DJ, electronic music artist